General elections were held in the Territory of Papua and New Guinea between 19 February and 11 March 1972. They saw the election of the country's first female MP, Josephine Abaijah.

Electoral system
The House of Assembly was expanded from 94 to 107 members, consisting of 100 elected members, four civil servants and three members nominated by members of the House to represent special interest groups. The 100 elected members were elected from 82 open constituencies and 18 regional constituencies, from each of which a single member was elected by single transferable vote. Voters could vote for a candidate in both their local open constituency and the regional constituency covering their area. Candidacy in the regional constituencies was limited to people who had received the Intermediate Certificate (or an equivalent) from school.

Prior to the elections, the voting age was lowered from 21 to 18. A total of 1,384,780 voters were enrolled.

To reduce the reliance on 'whispered' votes (in which illiterate voters told polling officials who they wished to vote for), photos of the candidates were added to ballot papers.

Campaign
A total of 611 candidates contested the 100 seats in the House of Assembly, of which four were women and 74 were incumbents running for re-election. Two seats – East Sepik Regional and West Sepik Coastal Open – had only one candidate, both of whom (Michael Somare of the Pangu Party and Brere Awol respectively) were returned unopposed. Incumbent MP for Morobe Regional, Tony Voutas, chose not to run after becoming an official within the Pangu Party. Other incumbents stepping down included Percy Chatterton (Moresby Open).

Results
Only 38 of the 72 incumbents that contested the elections were re-elected. The new House of Assembly had 37 members of the United Party, 11 from the People's Progress Party, 18 members of the Pangu Party, 8 members of the Niugini National Party, and 3 from the Mataungan Association.

Aftermath
Following the elections Michael Somare was able to form a coalition government including his Pangu Party, the People's Progress Party, the Niugini National Party, the Mataungan Association and a group of independents led by John Guise. Somare's bloc nominated Perry Kwan for the post of Speaker; Kwan won by a vote of 49–48 against United Party candidate Matthias Toliman. However, Kwan resigned from the post June, saying he was too inexperienced for the role. Barry Holloway was elected to replace him.

A new government was formed led by Somare as Deputy Chairman of the Administrator's Executive Council.

See also
Members of the National Parliament of Papua New Guinea, 1972–1977

Notes

References

Papua
1972 in Papua New Guinea
Elections in Papua New Guinea
Election and referendum articles with incomplete results